Petrovka is a rural locality (a selo) in Novopoltavsky Selsoviet, Klyuchevsky District, Altai Krai, Russia. The population was 132 as of 2013. There are 6 streets.

Geography 
Petrovka is located 28 km north of Klyuchi (the district's administrative centre) by road. Novopoltava is the nearest rural locality.

References 

Rural localities in Klyuchevsky District